St Hilary's Chapel (also St Hilary's Church) is a former church in Denbigh, Denbighshire, north Wales, of which only the tower remains. The town's garrison church, it lay to the north Denbigh Castle. In the 1530s the antiquary John Leland described it as a "goodlye and large chappelle in the old towne... whither most of the new towne do yett cumme". On 28 September 1645, during the English Civil War, a service at the church was attended by Charles I, the Archbishop of York, Lord Keeper Williams and numerous other important officials.

The limestone rubble church with red and brown and green sandstone dressings was abandoned in 1874 when a church was erected at St Mary's Church, Lenten Pool. The tower became a Grade I listed building on 24 October 1950.

References

External links
 
 

Denbigh, Saint Hilary
Saint Hilary's Chapel
Chapels in Denbighshire